Pirquet is an eroded lunar impact crater that lies to the northwest of the larger crater Levi-Civita on the far side of the Moon. About three crater diameters to the west is the prominent Tsiolkovskiy. To the north-northeast of Pirquet is Denning.

The rim and interior of Pirquet are marked by a number of small craterlets. A small crater is protruding into the inner wall along the south-southeastern side. This crater is slightly elongated along the east–west direction, making it appear slightly oval.

Satellite craters
By convention these features are identified on lunar maps by placing the letter on the side of the crater midpoint that is closest to Pirquet.

References

 
 
 
 
 
 
 
 
 
 
 
 

Impact craters on the Moon